"Superhuman" is the second single released by Chris Brown from the album Exclusive: The Forever Edition, and the sixth and final single overall off Exclusive. The song features Keri Hilson.

Music video
Erik White directed the music video, which was filmed in Charlotte, North Carolina. It was Brown's seventh video directed by White and was shot back-to-back with Ludacris' "What Them Girls Like" and "Dreamer".

Chart performance
Despite not being officially released, the song debuted at number 40 on the New Zealand RIANZ Singles Chart and peaked at number 15, becoming the album's sixth top 20 hit in New Zealand. The song was certified Gold after seventeen weeks selling over 7,500 copies.  It also debuted at number 33 in Ireland and number 40 on the UK Singles Chart due to strong downloads following the premiere of the music video. The song has reached number 32 on the UK Singles Chart, and was physically released in the UK on November 24, 2008. It has also become Brown's 6th Top 20 hit in Ireland, peaking at number 15 on the Irish Singles Chart. It debuted, the first week on the Australian Singles Chart on November 3, 2008, at number 36, and has peaked at number 30. The single peaked at number 109 in the United States, becoming his first single to miss the Billboard Hot 100.

Track listing
UK and Ireland CD single
 "Superhuman" (featuring Keri Hilson)
 "Dreamer"

Credits and personnel
 Vocals: C. Brown & K. Hilson
 Writers: W. Felder, J. Faunteroy II
 Producers: Harvey Mason Jr. for Underdog Music, inc. & Oak of The Knightwritaz for Ninetimesnine Entertainment
 Recording: Andrew Hey & Dabling Harward at The Underlab, Los Angeles, CA
 Additional engineering: David Boyd for Underdog Entertainment at The Underlab, Los Angeles, CA
 Mixing: Harvey Mason Jr. for Underdog Entertainment at The Underlab, Los Angeles, California
 Production coordination: David "Touch" Wright & Angela N. Golightly for Underdog Entertainment and Donnie Meadows & Tanisha Broadwater for Starr Island Management
 All music by: Oak of The Knightwritaz for Ninetimesnine Entertainment
 Keri Hilson appears courtesy of Mosley Music Group and Interscope Records

Charts

Certifications

References

2008 singles
Chris Brown songs
Keri Hilson songs
Pop ballads
Contemporary R&B ballads
Music videos directed by Erik White
2008 songs
Songs written by James Fauntleroy
Jive Records singles
Songs written by Oak Felder
Male–female vocal duets
Song recordings produced by Oak Felder